Mária Gál (15 August 1945 – April 2014) was a Hungarian volleyball player. She competed in the women's tournament at the 1972 Summer Olympics.

References

1945 births
2014 deaths
Hungarian women's volleyball players
Olympic volleyball players of Hungary
Volleyball players at the 1972 Summer Olympics
Volleyball players from Budapest